Classic Country Music: A Smithsonian Collection was a multi-volume set of recordings released by the Smithsonian Institution. Released in 1990, the collection contains 100 tracks deemed to be significantly important to the history of country music.

Classic Country Music was issued on either four compact discs, four cassette tapes or six vinyl albums. It also contained an illustrated 84-page book by Bill C. Malone, a country music historian. Malone's extensively annotated essay details country music's history era by era, from its beginnings in the 1920s and commercialization during the 1930s through its growing popularity during the 1980s.

Significant artists whose works were included were Vernon Dalhart, Jimmie Rodgers, the Carter Family, Sons of the Pioneers, Bob Wills, Roy Acuff, Ernest Tubb, Eddy Arnold, Hank Williams, Johnny Cash, Kitty Wells, Loretta Lynn, Willie Nelson, George Jones, Alabama and The Judds. While many of country music's most important artists are included, notable artists whose works were absent – as acknowledged by Malone in his preface, because the artists chose not to participate – were Ray Charles, Merle Haggard, Reba McEntire, Linda Ronstadt, George Strait and Randy Travis.

This new collection replaced The Smithsonian Collection of Classic Country Music, an eight-volume, 143-track collection issued in 1981 (and whose liner notes were also written by Malone). The earlier set included many songs from the 1920s and 1930s, as well as bluegrass and other related genres to country music, and spanned the years 1922 to 1975.

Track listing
Note: The track listing reflects the content of the compact discs. The sequencing is identical on the albums and cassettes, but different tracks may be on different volumes.

References 

Country albums by American artists
1990 compilation albums
Country music compilation albums